The Sarcophagus of Adelphia  is an early Christian, circa 340 AD sarcophagus now in the Museo Archeologico Regionale Paolo Orsi in Syracuse, region of Sicily, Italy. The sarcophagus was found in the Rotunda of Adelphia inside the Catacombs of San Giovanni, in Siracusa. The iconography displayed has similarities to the layout of the Dogmatic and Junius Bassus sarcophagi, although the quality of to depictions is simplified.

Description

The name of the sarcophagus derives from the hypothesis that it was used for the burial of the Roman noblewoman Adelfia. The central medallion would represent a portrait of the couple, mentioned in the center of the lid by an epigraph arranged on three lines in a tabula ansata on a red background:

  (H)IC ADELFIA C(LARISSIMA) F(EMINA)

  POSITA CONPAR

  BALERI COMITIS

Here lies Adelphia, famous woman, wife of Count Valerius.

The front side of the marble sarcophagus is split into two registers, typical of the style of the time, with both Old Testament and New Testament subjects and a central shell-shaped clipeus containing the portraits of the dead couple, embracing. The lid of the sarcophagus forms a third register. Of note, the depictions of Moses and Jesus, and perhaps God in Eden, are unbearded, as opposed to the bearded Abraham. The scenes are depicted in a high bas relief. The scenes do not follow a timeline, and can be poorly distinct from one another.

In the upper lid are likely four episodes, two likely regarding the life of Mary on the left, and two depicting events surrounding the Nativity, including the three Magi following the star of Bethlehem. It also contains a plaque identifying Adelphia and her spouse Valerius.
The second register has eight episodes, four on each side of the central shell with the married couple.
On the left, from left to right, are scenes depicting:
Work imposed on Adam and Eve
Denial of Peter with the cockerel
Jesus healing the bleeding woman
Moses receives tablets
On the right are scenes depicting 
Abraham and Isaac
Christ heals the blind
Miracle of Multiplication of the loaves
Raising of the son of the widow of Nain

In the third (lowest) register, are scenes depicting:
Shadrach, Meshach, and Abednego refuse pagan worship
Miracle at the Marriage at Cana
Adoration of the Magi
Adam, Eve, and the Serpent in the Tree of the Knowledge of Good and Evil
Jesus enters Jerusalem

References

Adelphia
Statues of Jesus
4th-century Roman sculptures
Christian iconography
Early Christian art
Cultural depictions of Adam and Eve
Adoration of the Magi in art
Saint Peter